Antônio Everton Sena Barbosa (born June 14, 1991 in Recife), known as Everton Sena, is a Brazilian footballer, who plays as a centre-back. Even being young is idol Santa Cruz and is nationally known as a great marker.

Honours
Santa Cruz
Campeonato Pernambucano: 2011, 2012, 2013, 2015, 2016
Campeonato Brasileiro Série C: 2013
Copa Pernambuco: 2008, 2009, 2010
Taça Chico Science: 2016 
Copa do Nordeste: 2016

External links
  
  Ogol
  Sambafoot

1991 births
Living people
Brazilian footballers
Brazilian expatriate footballers
Association football forwards
Association football midfielders
Sportspeople from Recife
Campeonato Brasileiro Série B players
Campeonato Brasileiro Série C players
Campeonato Brasileiro Série D players
Expatriate footballers in Bolivia
Santa Cruz Futebol Clube players
Boa Esporte Clube players
Londrina Esporte Clube players
Goiás Esporte Clube players
Clube de Regatas Brasil players
Grêmio Novorizontino players
Esporte Clube Vitória players
Cuiabá Esporte Clube players
Club Always Ready players
Clube do Remo players
Brazilian expatriate sportspeople in Bolivia